Dong Ding (pronounced ), also spelled Tung-ting, is an oolong tea from Taiwan. A translation of Dong Ding is "Frozen Summit" or "Icy Peak", and is the name of the mountain in Taiwan where the tea is cultivated. Those plants were brought to Taiwan from the Wuyi Mountains in China's Fujian Province about 150 years ago.

The mountain is located in the Lugu region of Nantou County in central Taiwan, an area long used for growing tea. Dong Ding is typically composed of 3-4 leaves, sometimes including a bud, picked by hand or machine. Afterwards, the tea undergoes a withering process, either outside, indoors, or a combination of both. The leaves are then tossed and bruised on large bamboo baskets, which begins the oxidation process. Final rolling is undertaken, either by hand or by machine. A final firing sets the oxidation typically somewhere between 15%-30% oxidation, sometimes over charcoal, giving the tea a toasty, woody flavor.

References

Oolong tea
Taiwanese tea